The 2019 South American Aerobic Gymnastics Championships were held in Melgar, Colombia, from August 27 to September 1, 2019. The competition was organized by the Colombian Gymnastics Federation and approved by the International Gymnastics Federation.

Medalists

References

2019 in gymnastics
International gymnastics competitions hosted by Colombia
2019 in Colombian sport
South American Gymnastics Championships